Mortezaabad (also Romanized as Morteẕáābād; also known as Murtuzabad) is a village in Ilat-e Qaqazan-e Sharqi Rural District, Kuhin District, Qazvin County, Qazvin Province, Iran. As per 2006 census, its population was 42, in 12 families.

References 

Populated places in Qazvin County